Ileogbo is the headquarters of Aiyedire Local Government in Osun State, Nigeria.  It is situated midway between Ibadan and Osogbo, the capitals of Oyo and Osun State.  Ibadan is about 44 km to the south of Ileogbo while Osogbo is about 42 km to its north, Oyo 40 km to its west, while Gbongan and Ife are located to the east of the town.

The name Ileogbo comes from an old Yoruba folk tale that the people in this town had a very long life span.  Ileogbo means the land of the old.  The settlers in this town used to have a saying "Ile Ogbo mi ni mo de yi" (meaning the place where I will live till I am very old), and the name was later shortened to Ileogbo.

The Olu of Ileogbo is Oba Abeeb Adetoyese Agbaje (aka Kadara) Arowo Okun Joye 11

Ileogbo is one of the famous Yoruba land with its famous cultural activities and tradition,

Attractions:

Ore (ileogbo Ilu ore, omo arepo panda)  said to be the protector of ileogbo citizen both  home and abroad. Ore festival come once a year and it attracts people far and wide. 
Ore tree is as strange as finding a lion in a hole dug in the ground that harbors a rat. When you account for the mother of whom her child's biography is shoddy, its sound unbelievable. But such is the feature of the cradle of a sacred Oore Tree located in Ileogbo.

Ileogbo, inarguably is a product of Ore Tree. The tree, because of its peculiarity, is a pointer to the seating of Ileogbo, the headquarters of Ayedire Local Government in Osun State. The tree life span is uncertain as the first settlers are younger than Ore tree.

The tree was located circa 1840 subsequent to a spiritual consultation with oracle by Kuseela, the only surviving Prince of the war between Fulani and Ileogbo in 1822. Ileogbo was checkmated by Fulanis in 1822, thus, the former site became desolated. After the clash between the troops of Alaafin and the Fulanis in Osogbo in 1840, tranquility returned to the affected Yoruba towns, Ileogbo inclusive. The development triggered Kuseela, consulted an oracle and was divined that he stops, with his entourage where ever he finds a tree tied with white cloth. It was divined that he, with his people shall organize a prosperous kingdom.

Tradition had it that the tree is manned by a male (Baba Abore) and a female (Iya Abore) appointed on the advice of the king. One of the past Iya Abore from Agbo Ile Olukoun nicknamed the tree Alhaja Jarawu. This name is not unconnected with the female spirit the tree is said to shelter. Some traditionalists considered Ore (Oluwere) as a strong protection against any havoc in Ileogbo. The tree does not shed its leaves under its shade.

Egungun festival (masquerade) it is festivity that draws people from other towns and cities to Ileogbo. Some of the most popular Egungun in the land are Obadimeji, Apatapiti, Sodo and many more

Igbo festival is a must see tradition where young and old, men and women, boys and girls loyal to thefestival, especially those with ancestral Origin of Ejigbo, will be flogging themselves publicly in the city center.

Ileogbo has some private and public secondary schools like Luther Kings college ileogbo, Community High School, Ileogbo, African church grammar school, kuta/ileogbo others are Royal ambassador international college, ileogbo, Omoloye group of schools, ileogbo, Daarul-Hikmah Islamic School, Glorious group of schools, ileogbo and lots more.

Ileogbo is well known for community efforts in development. The town was the only town in the Western Nigeria where major project of creating a bridge on a major river (River Osun) was solely financed by the community.

References

External links
Ileogbo website
The Ancient Sacred Oore Tree In Ileogbo

Osun State
Populated places in Osun State